|}

The Liberthine Mares' Chase, currently run as the Mrs Paddy Power Mares' Chase, is a Grade 2 National Hunt chase in Great Britain which is open to mares aged five years or older. It is run on the New Course at Cheltenham over a distance of about 2 miles and 4½ furlongs (2 miles 4 furlongs and 127 yards, or 4,139 metres), and during its running there are seventeen fences to be jumped. It is scheduled to take place each year during the Cheltenham Festival in March.

The race was run for the first time in 2021 and replaced the Centenary Novices' Handicap Chase on the Cheltenham Festival programme.

Records
Most successful horse:
 no horse has won this race more than once
Leading jockey :
 no jockey has won this race more than once
Leading trainer (2 wins):
 Willie Mullins – Colreevy (2021), Elimay (2022)

Winners

See also
 Horse racing in Great Britain
 List of British National Hunt races

References

Racing Post:
, 

National Hunt races in Great Britain
Cheltenham Racecourse
National Hunt chases
Recurring sporting events established in 2021
2021 establishments in England